The Syverma Plateau is a mountain plateau in Krasnoyarsk Krai, Siberia, Russia. It is a part of the Central Siberian Plateau. The plateau is located in largely uninhabited area.

Geography  

The Syverma Plateau is located in central Krasnoyarsk Krai. To the north it merges with the Putorana Mountains and to the west the border with the Tunguska Plateau is not clearly defined. To the east the Syverma Plateau limits with the Vilyuy Plateau.

The Syverma Plateau is deeply cut by river valleys flowing roughly southwards from the Putorana ranges, such as the Vivi River, Tutonchana,  Tembenchi, Embenchime, Kochechum and other right hand tributaries of the Lower Tunguska River.

Geology
Geologically the Syverma Plateau is made up of Triassic volcanic rocks.

Flora and climate
The plateau is covered by larch taiga. Owing to the permafrost trees grow very slowly.

The climate prevailing in the Syverma Plateau is severe, of the subarctic continental type with long, cold winters. Summers are moderately warm with temperatures reaching  in July.

References

External links
Soil Cover of the North of Central Siberia
Evolution of the West Siberian Basin
Climate Changes in Siberia
Central Siberian Plateau
Landforms of Krasnoyarsk Krai